The 2014–15 Pittsburgh Panthers men's basketball team represented the University of Pittsburgh during the 2014–15 NCAA Division I men's basketball season. The team played its home games at the Petersen Events Center in Pittsburgh, Pennsylvania. The Panthers were led by twelfth-year head coach Jamie Dixon. They were members of the Atlantic Coast Conference. They finished the season 19–15, 8–10 in ACC play to finish in a three-way tie for ninth place. They lost in the first round of the ACC tournament to NC State. They were invited to the National Invitation Tournament where they lost in the first round to George Washington.

Last season
The Panthers finished the season 26–10, 11–7 in ACC play to finish in fifth place. They advanced to the semifinals of the ACC tournament where they lost to Virginia. They received an at-large bid to the NCAA tournament as a number nine seed where they defeated Colorado in the first round before losing in the second round to number one seeded Florida.

Departures

Incoming Transfers

Class of 2014 signees

Roster

}

}

}

}

}

Schedule

|-
!colspan=9 style="background:#091C44; color:#CEC499;" | Bahamas Foreign Tour

|-
!colspan=12 style="background:#091C44; color:#CEC499;" | Scrimmage

|-
!colspan=12 style="background:#091C44; color:#CEC499;" | Exhibition

|-
!colspan=12 style="background:#091C44; color:#CEC499;" | Regular season

|-
!colspan=9 style="background:#091C44; color:#CEC499;"| ACC Tournament

|-
!colspan=9 style="background:#091C44; color:#CEC499;"| NIT

References

Pittsburgh Panthers men's basketball seasons
Pittsburgh
Pittsburgh
Pittsburgh Pan
Pittsburgh Pan